Qortin Redoubt, also known as Eskalar Redoubt, is a redoubt in the limits of Mellieħa, Malta. It was built by the Order of Saint John in 1715–1716 as one of a series of coastal fortifications around the Maltese Islands. Today, the redoubt still exists, but it has some modern modifications.

History
Qortin Redoubt was built in 1715–1716 as part of the first building programme of coastal fortifications in Malta. It was part of a chain of fortifications that defended the northern coast of Malta, which also included Aħrax Tower, several batteries, redoubts and entrenchments. The nearest fortifications to Qortin Redoubt are Tal-Bir Redoubt to the west and Vendôme Battery to the east.

The redoubt originally consisted of a pentagonal platform with a low parapet. A rectangular blockhouse was located at the centre of its gorge. It was not armed with any artillery.

Construction of Qortin Redoubt cost around 1239.8.19 scudi.

Present day
Today, the pentagonal platform still exists, but the parapet has been removed. The blockhouse has been demolished and a summer residence has been built in its place.

References

External links

National Inventory of the Cultural Property of the Maltese Islands

Redoubts in Malta
Mellieħa
Hospitaller fortifications in Malta
Military installations established in 1715
Limestone buildings in Malta
National Inventory of the Cultural Property of the Maltese Islands
18th-century fortifications
1715 establishments in Malta
18th Century military history of Malta